Low Flame is an album by saxophonist Sonny Stitt recorded in 1962 and released on the Jazzland label.

Reception
The Allmusic review stated: "This small combo jazz fits between Bebop and soul-jazz, dominated by group-penned material. Stitt gets an especially smoky tone on the ballads, particularly on the title track".

Track listing 
All compositions by Sonny Stitt except as indicated
 "Low Flame" - 4:59     
 "Put Your Little Foot Right Out" (Larry Spier) - 5:25     
 "Cynthia Sue" (Paul Weeden) - 6:02     
 "Donald Duck" (Don Patterson) - 4:40     
 "Close Your Eyes" (Bernice Petkere) - 3:43     
 "Silly Billy" - 4:58     
 "Baby, Do You Ever Think of Me" - 2:55     
 "Fine and Dandy" (Paul James, Kay Swift) - 7:56

Personnel 
Sonny Stitt - alto saxophone, tenor saxophone - on 1,2 and 6
Don Patterson - organ  
Paul Weeden - guitar
Billy James - drums

References 

1962 albums
Jazzland Records (1960) albums
Sonny Stitt albums
Albums produced by Orrin Keepnews